The 2017 Girls' Youth Pan-American Volleyball Cup was played from March 28, 2017 to April 2, 2017 in Habana, Cuba. Ten teams competed in this season.

Competing nations

Preliminary round
All times are in Cuba Daylight Time (UTC−04:00)

Group A

Group B

Group C

Final round

Championship bracket

7th–10th places bracket

Classification 7–10

Quarterfinals

Semifinals

Ninth place match

Seventh place match

Fifth place match

Bronze medal match

Final

Final standing

Individual awards

Most Valuable Player
 
Best Scorer
 
Best Setter
 
Best Opposite
 
Best Outside Hitters
 
 
Best Middle Blockers
 
 
Best Libero
 
Best Server
 
Best Receiver
 
Best Digger

References

External links

Women's Pan-American Volleyball Cup
Youth Pan-American Volleyball Cup
Girls Youth Pan American Volleyball Cup
Volleyball
March 2017 sports events in North America
April 2017 sports events in North America